Tokyo Sungoliath (formerly known as Suntory Sungoliath) is owned by the Suntory beverage company and is one of the Japanese rugby union teams in the Top League. The team is based in Fuchū, Tokyo, as is their local rival Toshiba Brave Lupus. The team rebranded as Tokyo Sungoliath ahead of the rebranding of the Top League to the Japan Rugby League One in 2022.

Suntory coached by Katsuyuki Kiyomiya won the Microsoft Cup on February 24, 2008 by defeating Sanyo Wild Knights in a close and exciting game, 14-10. Suntory therefore became the champion of the Top League for the 2007–08 season.

On June 18, 2008 it was announced that George Gregan, the most-capped player in the sport's history, had joined the club on a two-year contract. (Daily Yomiuri, June 19, 2008) Gregan remained with the club until he announced his retirement at the end of the 2010–11 season.

Honours

 All-Japan Championship
 Champions: 1995, 2000, 2001, 2011, 2012
 Runner-up: 2008
 Microsoft Cup
 Champions: 2007–08
 Runner-up: 2005–06, 2006–07
 All-Japan Company Championship
 Champions: 1995, 2001, 2002
 Top League Championship
 Champions: 2011–12

History
The club was established in 1980, and since then they have won the All-Japan Championship on numerous occasions. They have also compete in the recently formed Top League since its founding in 2003. The team has been improving in the League over the past few years. Suntory Sungoliath famously beat Wales 45-41 on Saturday 3 June 2001 whilst they were on tour in Japan.

Top League Results

In the first season of the Top League, 2003–04, Suntory finished 4th. In 2004–05 they finished 8th. The team was 6th in the 2005–06 season and jumped up to 2nd in the 2006-7 season under new coach Katsuyuki Kiyomiya and assisted by Michael Jones.
In 2006 Suntory Sungoliath lost the final of the Top League and Microsoft Cup title to Toshiba Brave Lupus by a score of 33-18. Then in February 2007, Suntory Sungoliath again lost the final of the Top League and Microsoft Cup to Toshiba Brave Lupus before a crowd of 23,076 at Tokyo's Chichibunomiya Stadium (home to Mark Secker), the first sellout at the ground in 10 years, with the final score being just 14-13 to Toshiba Brave Lupus.
In the first Top League game of the 2007-8 season Suntory gained revenge over Toshiba with a 10-3 win on October 26, 2007. At the end of the 13-game season Suntory was second behind Sanyo Wild Knights, having lost to Sanyo and by just one point to Coca-Cola West Red Sparks, and drawn 31-31 with Toyota Verblitz in the final round. Sanyo and Suntory met again in the Microsoft Cup final on February 24 to decide the 2007–08 Top League champion. Suntory won that game 14-10 with a very strong mauling attack.

Top League Table

The table begins with the first season of the Top League, 2003-04.

Current squad

The Tokyo Sungoliath squad for the 2023 season is:

 * denotes players qualified to play for the Japan on dual nationality or residency grounds.

Notable former players
Tusi Pisi – Manu Samoa international fly-half
Schalk Burger – South African flanker
Fourie du Preez – South African scrum half
Uche Odouza – winger, England (England 7s)
George Gregan – Australian scrum-half and the 2nd most-capped player in international rugby history
Rocky Havili – Tongan centre
Toru Kurihara – Japan fullback or wing
Simon Maling – former All Black lock from 2001 to 2004
Beauden Barrett - All Black five-eighth, 2015 Rugby World Cup Winner
Jamie Washington 
George Smith – former Australian flanker 2000-2009, 2013
Norm Hadley – lock, former Canadian captain, Barbarian
Glenn Ennis – former Canadian No. 8, Barbarian

Coach
  Katsuyuki Kiyomiya (2006–09)
  Eddie Jones (2009–12)
  Naoya Okubo (2012–14)
  Andy Friend (2014–16)
  Keisuke Sawaki (2016–2019)
  Milton Haig (2020-)

External links
Suntory Sungoliath - official home page
George Gregan and Goliath, 365.com (June 20, 2008)
Suntory are Top League Champions - JRFU English website, February 24, 2008
Stylish Sungoliath turn out lights on Wild Knights, Daily Yomiuri, October 16, 2006
Wales suffer opening defeat, scrum.com, June 3, 2001

References

Japan Rugby League One teams
Rugby in Kantō
Rugby clubs established in 1980
Sports teams in Tokyo
Suntory
Fuchū, Tokyo
1980 establishments in Japan